The Shire of Charlton was a local government area about  north-northwest of Melbourne, the state capital of Victoria, Australia.

History

Charlton was first incorporated as a shire on 28 May 1895, upon the severance of portions of the Shires of Gordon, Kerang and St Arnaud.

On 20 January 1995, the Shire of Charlton was abolished, and along with the Shires of Birchip, Donald and Wycheproof, and parts of the Shire of Kara Kara, was merged into the newly created Shire of Buloke.

Wards

The Shire of Charlton was divided into three ridings on 25 May 1988, each of which elected three councillors:
 North Riding
 South Riding
 West Riding

Towns and localities
 Barrakee
 Buckrabanyule
 Charlton*
 Coonooer Bridge
 Dooboobetic
 Glenloth
 Nareewillock
 Teddywaddy
 Terrappee
 Wooroonook
 Yawong
 Yeungroon

* Council seat.

Population

* Estimate in the 1958 Victorian Year Book.

References

External links
 Victorian Places - Charlton and Charlton Shire

Charlton